Pygoscelis tyreei, also referred to as Tyree's penguin, is an extinct species of penguin from New Zealand. It was slightly smaller than the extant gentoo penguin, standing 70 to 80 cm high. Of Late Pliocene age, it is known only from fossil remains collected from Motunau Beach, North Canterbury.

References

Extinct birds of New Zealand
Extinct penguins
Pliocene birds
Pygoscelis
Fossil taxa described in 1972
Birds described in 1972